T. J. Hughes, registered and styled as TJ Hughes, is a British discount department store brand which first emerged in Liverpool in 1912

The business grew to become a national chain with 57 stores by 2011 but shrank to just six locations after entering administration that year. In recent years, the chain has opened and closed various new sites and as of 2021 trades from 13 stores as well as online.

History

Establishment
Thomas J. Hughes set up a small shop on Liverpool's London Road after an apprenticeship at fellow drapery firm Owen Owen. The store had a few assistants and Hughes was the main shopkeeper, overseeing everything within the business.

In 1925 Owen Owen saw the need to move out of their Audley House site on London Road into the new centre of Liverpool at Clayton Square. The then chairman of Owen Owen, Duncan Norman, went to see the TJ Hughes shop. Norman was so impressed that he agreed to let Hughes run and expand his business in Audley House for part ownership of the business under Owen Owen. By now a department store, TJ Hughes was gradually expanded by the Owen Owen group until being sold in 1991.

TJ Hughes was floated on the London Stock Exchange in May 1992 before being acquired by JJB Sports in March 2002 for £42 million. In November 2003, the company was sold again in a £56 million buyout backed by PPM Capital.

During the 1990s and 2000s, TJ Hughes took over a number of premises formerly occupied by other retailers including Owen Owen (Kidderminster and Wolverhampton), Allders (Ipswich), C&A (Glasgow, Romford and Hull), House of Fraser (Sheffield and Eastbourne) and various Co-operative Group stores (Warrington, Bradford, Doncaster and Crawley). From 2009, expansion picked up again with the addition of a further seven stores by early 2011. A number of these openings were in locations left vacant by Woolworths which had collapsed in late 2008.

In March 2011, TJ Hughes was sold to turnaround specialist Endless LLP for an undisclosed sum. Endless bought TJ Hughes from Silverfleet Capital, who had overseen growth of around twenty stores since taking control of the firm in 2003. The sale followed reports that TJ Hughes had been hit by the withdrawal of credit insurance for its suppliers after a battle to secure working capital.

2011 Administration
On 27 June 2011, TJ Hughes Limited announced that it intended to go into administration, putting 4,000 jobs at risk. TJ Hughes officially entered administration on Thursday 30 June 2011, with Ernst & Young appointed as administrators. The company launched a closing down sale in a bid to reduce stock levels.

Ernst & Young said it hoped to sell the company as a going concern, saying it was "very much business as usual" but added that it could be difficult to sell all of the stores owing to the previous trading history of TJ Hughes. There were reports of a number of prospective buyers, including Primark.

On 7 July 2011, GA Europe acquired Endless’ secured debt due from TJ Hughes and announced plans to work with administrators Ernst & Young to liquidate stock from the retail chain’s 57 stores.

On 22 July, Ernst & Young announced the company's Liverpool distribution centre would close, making 116 employees redundant.

On 1 August, Lewis Home Retail, a company associated with Speke based Benross Group, acquired the TJ Hughes brand and website together with the flagship Liverpool store as well as the Eastbourne, Glasgow and Sheffield locations. This was shortly followed by the Newcastle and Widnes stores, bringing the total saved to six.

On 4 August, Ernst & Young announced the closure of the first twenty two unsold TJ Hughes stores throughout the United Kingdom. Store closures began on 10 August, with Shrewsbury closing first.

Ernst & Young announced on 20 August that the remainder of the 51 unsold TJ Hughes stores would close their doors by 31 August 2011.

Closed stores included Belfast, Birkenhead, Bolton, Bootle, Boscombe, Bradford, Bristol, Burnley, Chester, Corby, Coventry, Crawley, Derby, Doncaster, Dumfries, Dundee, Ellesmere Port, Hanley, Hull, Ipswich, Kettering, Kidderminster, King's Lynn, Lichfield, Macclesfield, Maidstone, Middlesbrough, Newport, Nuneaton, Oldham, Plymouth, Preston, Redditch, Rochdale, Romford, Salford, Scunthorpe, Shrewsbury, Southend, St Helens, Stretford, Sunderland, Sutton, Walsall, Warrington, Watford, Weston-super-Mare, Wolverhampton and Wrexham.

Post-2011 openings and closures
Since emerging from administration in 2011, TJ Hughes stores have opened or reopened in the following locations:
 2012: Birkenhead (since closed), Cannock (since closed), Middlesbrough (since closed)
 2013: Coventry (since closed), Sheffield (relocation; since closed)
 2014: Hartlepool, Stretford (since closed)
 2015: Bootle, Bury, Oldham (since closed), Walsall (since closed)
 2016: Chelmsford (since closed), St Helens, Preston, Maidstone
2017: Chesterfield (since closed), Nuneaton (since closed)
2018: Dundee (since closed), East Kilbride (since closed), Livingston (since closed)
2019: Bradford (since closed), Clydebank, Cumbernauld, Durham

TJ Hughes stated in 2015 that it may seek to open as many as 55 stores in total.

In May 2019 TJ Hughes announced that it would be closing its Eastbourne store. The last trading day was Wednesday 22 May 2019.

The company placed one of its subsidiaries in administration during early 2020, leading to the closure of a small number of stores including those in Sheffield and Chesterfield.

Sales strategy

In December 2005, TJ Hughes launched an online store through eBay, with eBay claiming that the retailer was the first in the United Kingdom to sell its main products through the auction site. The store launched with 110 lines including DVD players, digital cameras and perfumes. TJ Hughes said its eBay shop represented an opportunity to increase sales and brand awareness.

One of the retailer's advertising tactics was to feature relatives of famous celebrities in their advertisements. For example, they used former Manchester United F.C. player Wayne Rooney's brother Graeme Rooney as part of an advertising campaign.

During 2007, the company unveiled its largest advertising campaign to date. This featured celebrities’ family members, with recruits to the campaign including Carol Vorderman’s mother, Jonathan Ross’s mother and Robbie Williams’ father. The aim of the somewhat unusual series of ads was apparently to eschew passing on the costs of celebrity endorsement to customers, which TJ Hughes claims is the case for a number of its competitors.

Online
TJ Hughes was a late runner in the e-commerce era, establishing an information website for investors and customers in 1999/2000. Although a new site was launched in 2004, this continued to offer only basic information such as current offers and store locations. In spite of this, the company reported that this site received some 17,000 hits a month, which prompted them to look at the introduction of e commerce.

This was introduced on a trial basis in the run up to Christmas 2005, and offered 150 seasonal gifts and homewares lines.

An encouraging performance resulted in the trial being extended, with the company subsequently increasing the range of merchandise offered online, and by 2011 the company offered an extensive range of products on its website. The TJ Hughes website, designed by local digital agency YOMA, was ranked 108,004 worldwide and 5,237 in the United Kingdom according to Alexa.

Financial success
TJ Hughes saw gross profits soar almost 50% a year, from £3.6m in 2003, increasing to £7.9m in 2004 with a jump to £12m in 2006. Throughout 2007, TJ Hughes's pre-tax profits were £5.1 million in the year to 26 January, up from £1.2 million the year before. Operating profit soared 299 per cent to £2.9 million.

In January 2010, accounts showed pre-tax profits increased by more than £1.5m to £6.8m. That was achieved on sales of £266.7m, an annualised rise of 4%. Although the last full financial year before Ms Tennant was appointed, to January 2007, showed pre tax profits of £1.2m, they rose to £5.1m in the year to January 2008. This was followed by profits of £5.3m the following year.

Competition
The demise of Woolworths was seen to create significant opportunities in the homewares market, although other mixed goods discounters such as B&M and Wilko, which have some overlap in terms of product offer, have also been expanding rapidly in a bid to gain some of this market share both on the high street and increasingly in out of town locations. This is believed to be part of the reason as to why T. J. Hughes entered administration.

American retailer TJ Maxx, which also sells discounted clothing and housewares, modified its name to TK Maxx to avoid confusion with T. J. Hughes when it opened its first British store in 1994. It subsequently used the TK Maxx name for its other European operations.

References
 36. Eastbourne herald https://www.eastbourneherald.co.uk/news/people/tj-hughes-closing-down-in-eastbourne-1-8905331/amp&ved=2ahUKEwjA3fvY07PiAhVRURUIHb9nCPUQFjAkegQIAhAB&usg=AOvVaw0NQwJ1NNPJpd439XmxeZmG&ampcf=1

External links
 

Retail companies of the United Kingdom
Hughes T J
Companies based in Liverpool
Retail companies established in 1912
Discount shops of the United Kingdom
Companies that have entered administration in the United Kingdom
1912 establishments in England
British companies established in 1912